The Boy Friends is a series of American Pre-Code comedy short films released between 1930 and 1932. The series consisted of fifteen films and was spun off from the long running Our Gang film series (also known as The Little Rascals).

Overview
Like the Our Gang shorts of the time, The Boy Friends films are two-reel short subjects produced by Hal Roach through Metro-Goldwyn-Mayer.  They feature teenage actors including some, particularly Mickey Daniels and Mary Kornman, who as children had starred in the early silent Our Gang shorts. Grady Sutton was also a lead player in the series. Daniels and Sutton appear in every short, while Kornman appears in all but one (1932's You're Telling Me).

Roach released three The Boy Friends films in 1930: Doctor's Orders, Ladies Last, and Bigger and Better.  The series added seven installments in 1931: Blood and Thunder, High Gear, Love Fever, Air Tight, Call a Cop, Mama Loves Papa, and The Kickoff.  Finally, 1932 saw the release of the last five films: Love Pains, The Knockout, Too Many Women, Wild Babies, and You're Telling Me.  At least some of the films in the series took place at Elmira College, an actual school located in Roach's home town of Elmira, New York.

Characters
Mickey (Mickey Daniels): The main character. Appears in all entries.
Mary (Mary Kornman): Mickey's girl friend. Appears in all entries except You're Telling Me.
Grady "Alabam" Sutton (Grady Sutton): Mickey's best friend and sidekick. Appears in all entries.
Dave (David Sharpe): Mickey and Grady's friend. He is their rival in his first short. Last appears in Call a Cop!
Gertie (Gertrude Messinger): Dave's love interest. Last appears in The Kick-Off.
Dorothy (Dorothy Granger): Alabam's love interest. Last appears in Love Fever.
Betty (Betty Bolen): Alabam's love interest. Appears in Air-Tight, Mama Loves Papa, The Kick-Off!, Love Pains, The Knockout, You're Telling Me and Wild Babies.
Jacqui (Jacqueline Wells): Appears in The Knockout and You're Telling Me.

Filmography

1930
Doctor's Orders
Bigger and Better
Ladies Last

1931
Blood and Thunder
High Gear
Love Fever
Air-Tight
Call a Cop!
Mama Loves Papa
The Kick-Off!

1932
Love Pains
The Knock-Out
You're Telling Me
Wild Babies
Too Many Women

References

Sources

External links
 Introduction to The Boyfriends Shorts (TCM's details)
 'The Boy Friends' thread at Proboards

Film series introduced in 1930
1930s teen comedy films
1930s short films
American teen comedy films
American black-and-white films
1930s English-language films
Hal Roach Studios short film series
Metro-Goldwyn-Mayer short films
Our Gang
1930s American films